Karim Azkoul (Arabic: کریم عزقول) was a Lebanese diplomat and philosopher born in Rashaya, then part of the Ottoman Empire on July 15, 1915. His most notable achievements include his participation in the original writing of the Universal Declaration of Human Rights.

Personal life
Azkoul married Eva Corey in 1947. They had a son and a daughter. The son, Jad Azkoul is a world-renowned classical guitarist. Eva and Karim Azkoul both died in 2003, one week apart.

Azkoul's leisures included reading and writing.

Education
Azkoul attended the Jesuit University of St Joseph in Beirut, and later the Universities of Paris, Berlin, Bonn and Munich.

Career
Azkoul was a professor of history, Arab and French literature and philosophy in various colleges in Lebanon from 1939 to 1946. He was the Director of an Arabic publishing house and monthly Arabic review The Arab World in Beirut from 1943 to 1945.

As Lebanon's representative at the United Nations' talks on Human Rights at the time of their establishment, Azkoul contributed to their wording and significance.

There, he is known to have worked closely alongside Charles Malik.

He was Rapporteur of the Committee on Genocide in 1948, at which time he brought the issue of the Armenian Genocide to be recognized by the United Nations for the first time. He argued for the creation of the Genocide Convention against certain members (notably England) who were trying to declare it redundant, claiming the existence of Nuremberg trials were sufficient. It is said that Azkoul's voice "carried firmness and conviction" as he dismantled the opposition's arguments. 

Other work of his with the U.N. includes having been Acting Permanent Delegate to the U.N. from 1950 to 1953 and Head of U.N. Affairs Department (Ministry of Foreign Affairs of Lebanon) from 1953 to 1957.

On 10 November 1950, he was photographed at a U.N. radio alongside René Cassin, Georges Day and Herald C.L. Roy, participating in a roundtable discussion for the use of French-speaking countries.

He went on to become the Head Permanent Delegation to the U.N. from 1957 to 1959. He was photographed shaking hands with Dag Hammarskjöld (then U.N. Secretary General) when receiving his credentials there in 1958.

From 1959 to 1961, Azkoul was Consul General of Lebanon in Australia and New Zealand. From 1961 to 1964, he was ambassador to Ghana, Guinea and Mali, and to Iran and Afghanistan from 1964 to 1966.

Azkoul was a journalist from 1966 to 1968 before teaching as professor of philosophy at the Beirut College for Women from 1968 to 1972. In 1970 to 1972 he was a professor of philosophy at the Lebanese University.

In 1978, he was chief editor of The Joy of Knowledge (Arabic Encyclopaedia) and responsible for ten volumes therein.

He is also credited as having been vice chair to the Committee for Defence of Human Rights in Lebanon and member of the board of trustees, BD of Man. of Theological School of Balamand, Lebanon. Likewise as PEN, Emergency World Council, Hague in 1971.

Azkoul featured as an actor in a full-length film entitled Le Voyage étranger by Serge Roullet, released in 1992. Azkoul plays the role of "Le viel homme", or "the old man".

Character 
Azkoul was described by Raphael Lemkin, coiner of the term Genocide, as having had a "philosophical mind" whose voice carried "firmness and conviction", not being afraid of defending small nations' interests against the superpowers of his day.

Politics and philosophy
Karim Azkoul was an advocate of Pan-Arabism and was firmly anti-Zionist who often spoke out against foreign national intervention in the Middle East. He predicted that tensions would worsen if the United States continued to increase its military presence in the region. He also maintained that Lebanon (and the rest of the Arab world) was well on its way towards genuine democracy, as long as the western powers did not act against United Nations wishes when involving itself in the region's politics.

During his time at the United Nations, one of Azkoul's objectives was to keep the organization on track with what he considered to be one of its most important goals: to defend the weaker nations against the most powerful.

Azkoul never expressed any political alignment in the communist/capitalist debate and refused to be swept into British and American anticommunist rhetoric.

Quotes 
"Big nations can protect themselves with arms, but our only protection is international law."

"There is the feeling in Lebanon that the anticommunism of the Middle East comes largely from the influence of the United States and Britain."

Awards and recognition
Azkoul was awarded the National Order of the Cedar, Lebanon, the Order of the Holy Sepulchre, Jerusalem, the Order of Saint Marc, Alexandria, the Order of The Brilliant Star, Republic of China, the Order of Southern Star, Brazil and the Order of Saint Peter and Paul, Damascus.

Publications
Reason and Faith in Islam (German), 1938. Reason in Islam (Arabic), 1946. Freedom (co-author), 1956. Freedom of Association (U.N.), 1968

Translated into Arabic: Consciencism (Nkrumah), 1964. Arab Thought In The Liberal Age (Albert Hourani), 1969

References 

1915 births
2003 deaths
Lebanese diplomats
Lebanese philosophers
20th-century philosophers